The LOM M137 is a Czech aircraft engine, designed and produced by LOM Praha (Letecke Opravny Malesice, Praha) of Prague for use in light aircraft.

Design and development
The engine is a six-cylinder four-stroke, in-line,  displacement, air-cooled, direct drive, gasoline engine design. It employs dual magneto ignition and produces  for take-off at 2750 rpm, with a compression ratio of 6.3.

Variants
M137A
Model for limited aerobatics, to a maximum of 5 seconds inverted flight.
M137AZ
Model for advanced aerobatics, including inverted flight. This model can mount an air filter.

Applications
Zlín Z-50

Specifications (M132A)

See also

References

External links

LOM Praha aircraft engines
Air-cooled aircraft piston engines
2000s aircraft piston engines